Pierre Henri Landry (14 June 1899 – 7 December 1990) was a Russian-born French international tennis player. He competed once for the French team in the Davis Cup in 1926, defeating his opponent Colin Gregory in a dead rubber. In 1932 he was ranked 14th in the French rankings.

References 

1899 births
French male tennis players
1990 deaths
Tennis players from Moscow
Emigrants from the Russian Empire to France
Date of death missing